Eduardo L. Roberto or Ned Roberto is a Filipino professor who is considered Asia's foremost authority in marketing.  He was the professor of international marketing, at the Asian Institute of Management located in Metro Manila in the Philippines. He has written several marketing related books and is currently, a part of the editorial board of the International Journal of Research in Marketing. His areas of interest for teaching and research include marketing research, social marketing and consumer behavior. He has also taught at the Northwestern University’s Kellogg Graduate School of Management Chicago Campus and at the Euro-Asia Centre of INSEAD Macau.

Education
Roberto received his Doctor of Philosophy in Marketing and a Master in Business Administration degree from The Kellogg Management School of Northwestern University (1973.)

Career

Board memberships
 Chairman and president of Roberto & Associates, Inc., (RAI) a marketing research and consulting agency.
 Editorial Board of the International Journal of Research in Marketing.

He also sits on the board of directors of several corporations.

Positions held
 1985 president of the Marketing and Opinion Research Society of the Philippines (MORES.)
 Executive Vice-President of Consumer Pulse Inc. (now known as AC Nielsen), the ASEAN's largest survey research organization.
 Vice-President of Media Pulse, Inc.
 Executive Director of the International Council for the Management of Population Programmes (ICOMP).

Consultancy
Roberto has done extensive consultancy work region-wide for both national and transnational corporations and multilateral agencies.

In the Philippines
Roberto has been a  consultant for marketing planning, product management and marketing research to practically all the leading multinational corporations in the consumer goods, pharmaceutical, household products, beverage, cosmetics, processed food, banking, advertising, and airline industries.

Overseas
Roberto has been consulted by several major multinational corporations in Australia, Hong Kong, Indonesia, Japan, Malaysia, Singapore, Thailand and Taiwan.

International organisations
Roberto has also been involved in social marketing, planning & research and  consulting for international organizations such as the World Bank, the UN Fund for Population Activities, the International Labour Organization, the UN Development Programme, the Asian Development Bank, the Ford Foundation, the International Development Research Centre, the Population Council, and the UN Economic Commission for Asia and the Far East.

Notable works
Marketing research
 Applied Marketing Research
 User-Friendly Marketing Research

Social marketing
 Strategic Decision Making in a Social Program (the first social marketing book, 1975.) 
 Social Marketing: Strategies for Changing Public Behavior (co-authored with Philip Kotler) 
 Social Marketing: Improving the quality of life (co-authored with Philip Kotler and Nancy Lee) 

Market segmentation
 Strategic Market Segmentation
 A Guide to the Socio-Economic Classification of Filipino Consumers

Local governance
 Making Local Governance Work.

He has also published several articles on marketing and social marketing in national and international journals, newspapers and has contributed chapters in major books of readings in the field of marketing, such as “Alleviating Poverty: A Macro/Micro Marketing Perspective,” Journal of Macromarketing, December 2006, pp. 233–39 (co-authored with Philip Kotler and Tony Leisner.)

Awards and recognitions
 Philippine Marketing Association AGORA Award for Achievement in Marketing Education in 1983.
 Association of Marketing Educators of the Philippines´ 1st Lifetime Achievement Award as Marketing Educator in 2004.

See also
 Marketing
 Social marketing
 Philip Kotler
 Philippine Daily Inquirer

References

External links
 The MarketingRx blog

Year of birth missing (living people)
Living people
Filipino marketing people
Filipino educators
Kellogg School of Management alumni
Academic staff of the Asian Institute of Management